The Lexicon is a retail and leisure complex located in Bracknell, Berkshire. It was part of a wider regeneration project in the town, which saw a third of its centre demolished. The Lexicon was then constructed on the site and opened in 2017.

At the time of opening, it had 70 stores, restaurants, and a cinema. It was visited by Queen Elizabeth II in 2018.

Background
In 2010, a  development received planning permission for the redevelopment of Bracknell's town centre. The concept would regenerate part of the city centre and focus on retail and hospitality. Plans for the wider regeneration of Bracknell had been discussed for around a decade before the development broke ground in 2012. The development would see a third of Bracknell's town centre demolished due to its brutalist architecture. The Lexicon was a 50:50 joint venture between Legal & General Capital and Schroder UK Real Estate Fund. They collaborated with Bracknell Forest Council to develop the masterplan.

While under construction, the development was given the name "The Lexicon" in 2015. In 2017, the redevelopment of Bracknell town centre was completed and The Lexicon opened on 7 September. The regeneration project cost a total of £240 million. Upon completion, the new shopping district in Bracknell covered more than one million sq ft, with 70 new shops and restaurants and a cinema.

Shortly after its one-year anniversary, The Lexicon hosted Queen Elizabeth II when she visited Bracknell to witness what was referred to as "one of the biggest town centre regenerations in the UK."

In 2019, a second phase of the project began. A total of £30 million was secured for the redesign of Princes Square and the regeneration started in the same year.

Retail and leisure

When The Lexicon opened in 2017, it announced a number of notable tenants. The Avenue hosted two anchor tenants, Marks & Spencer and Fenwick.

Other retailers included  Joules, Fat Face, Superdry, Office, Next, H&M, River Island, Timberland, Paperchase, The Body Shop, Topshop, and Primark. Pandora also chose to open a store at The Lexicon in 2017.

The hospitality and leisure part of the development would include a 12-screen Cineworld, with restaurants including Nandos, Wagamama, Gourmet Burger Kitchen, and Carluccio's.

Location & transport
The development is located in the town centre of Bracknell, Berkshire. Bracknell was one of the UK's new towns launched in the 1950s.

The regeneration led to a purpose-built car park that would hold up to 4,000 cars. Other transport improvements were also made to the area.

Future plans 
The 2017 opening of The Lexicon marked the second phase of Bracknell's regeneration, with further plans to redevelop the town centre. 

Work is continuing to develop Princess Square and the area around the old Bentalls store, called The Deck.

References

Buildings and structures in Berkshire
Shopping centres in Berkshire
Buildings and structures completed in 2017
2017 establishments in England